Patricia Mayoulou (born 31 July 1981) is a Congolese handball player. She is member of the DR Congo national team, and competed at the 2015 World Women's Handball Championship in Denmark.

References

1981 births
Living people
Democratic Republic of the Congo female  handball players